The following list provides details for launches at the Yoshinobu Launch Complex since 2005.  Part of the Tanegashima Space Center, the facility hosts JAXA's major test firings and launches. Other launch facilities in the Space Center were previously used, with small rockets under development launched from the Takesaki Range. Additionally, the Osaki Launch Complex, where larger rockets were initially launched, was retired in 1992. Yoshinobu Launch ComplexThis list is sourced from the JAXA website.

Launches 

| colspan="6" |

2020

|-

| colspan="6" |

2019

|-

| colspan="6" |

2018

|-

|-

| colspan="6" |

2017

|-

| colspan="6" |

2016

|-

|-

| colspan="6" |

2015

|-

|-

| colspan="6" |

2014

|-

|-

|-

| colspan="6" |

2013

|-

| colspan="6" |

2012

|-

|-

| colspan="6" |

2011

|-

| colspan="6" |

2010

|-

|-

| colspan="6" |

2009

|-

|-

| colspan="6" |

2008

|-

| colspan="6" |

2007

|-

| colspan="6" |

2006

|-

|-

|-

| colspan="6" |

2005

|-

| colspan=6 |

References

Yoshinodu